George Cowl (1878–1942) was a British film actor active in the United States. He also directed four films during the silent era.

Selected filmography

 Dan (1914)
 The Rack (1916)
 The Closed Road (1916)
 The Beloved Adventuress (1917)
 Her Hour (1917)
 The Stolen Paradise (1917)
 The Crimson Dove (1917)
 Youth (1917)
 Betsy Ross (1917)
 The Corner Grocer (1917)
 The Iron Ring (1917)
 The Mystery of the Yellow Room (1919)
 Love, Honor and Obey (1920)
 The Shadow of Rosalie Byrnes (1920)
 The Plaything of Broadway (1921)
 Whispering Shadows (1921)
 The Glory of Clementina (1922)
 Pink Gods (1922)
 Fashionable Fakers (1923)
 The Prisoner (1923)
 Secrets (1924)
 The Jade Cup (1926)
 Marriage License? (1926)
 Broadway Madness (1927)
 Court Martial (1928)
 The Adventurer (1928)
 The Jazz Cinderella (1930)
 Secrets of Hollywood (1933)
 Riptide (1934)
 What Every Woman Knows (1934)
 Step Lively, Jeeves! (1937)
 Conquest (1937)
 Easy Living (1937)
 The Glass Key (1942)

References

Bibliography
 Goble, Alan. The Complete Index to Literary Sources in Film. Walter de Gruyter, 1999.
 Solomon, Aubrey. The Fox Film Corporation, 1915–1935: A History and Filmography. McFarland, 2011.

External links

1878 births
1942 deaths
British male film actors
British film directors
People from Blackpool
English emigrants to the United States